Đorđe Đorđević (also transliterated Djordje Djordjević; born 7 March 1988) is a Serbian football midfielder who last played for Apolonia Fier in Kategoria Superiore.

Career

Early career
He played for Turbina Vreoci, later Šumadija Jagnjilo, and then he moved to Slovenian club Krka from Novo Mesto. There he spent 2 seasons playing in lower ranked league. Also, he made 1 cup appearance in 2008–09 season. After playing in Slovenia, he returned in Serbian football, in Žarkovo.

Sloga Kraljevo

2011-12
He joined Sloga Kraljevo in season returning in Serbian First League. Smallish midfielder with number 13 on jersey fit in team very fast and he took a place in starting 11 already on the beginning. He usually played as defensive midfielder on the start of competition. He continued with good games, but after Veljko Antonijević's injury, he was moved on side right side midfielder. He showed that playing on that position is not strange for him, and because of playing near the opponents' goal he often scored goals. Đorđević was one of the best and most important players, together with Boban Dmitrović, Dejan Radosavljević, Darko Drinić, Miloš Janićijević, Nemanja Miletić, Marko Gobeljić... He ended season with 29 league appearances and scored 5 goals. 2 goals scored in away match against Srem Sremska Mitrovica, and 3 goals he scored in home wins against Radnički Sombor, Kolubara, and Novi Sad

2012-13
After successful season playing for Sloga, he was on abroad trial, but after failed engagement, he returned in Sloga, but because he missed preparing with team, he started season later. He mainly changed with Emir Rovčanin on defensive midfielder position until the end of first half of season. Later he played more offensive, playing as central midfielder. In season 2012–13, he made 21 league appearances, scoring 2 goals, against Radnički Nova Pazova away, and Voždovac home, when he was declared as man of the match. He also played on Lav Cup match in Sloga's lost with result 5:0 against OFK Beograd, replacing Dejan Radosavljević in second half.

Sinđelić Beograd
After playing for Sloga, he moved in Sinđelić Beograd, where he was one of the most important, usually wearing number 4 on his jersey. He started 21 match, some matches he was sitting on the bench. He scored 1 goal, and got 6 yellow and 2 red cards.

Apolonia Fier
After season with Sinđelić Beograd, he left in Albania, in Apolonia Fier. He made his Albanian Superliga debut in away lost 3:0 against KF Tirana. He played 20 league and 2 cup matches for Apolonia. After incident with Vilson Caković, he terminated the contract with club on 30 March 2015.

Career statistics

References

External links
 
 

1988 births
Living people
People from Topola
Association football midfielders
Serbian footballers
FK Sloga Kraljevo players
FK Sinđelić Beograd players
Serbian expatriate footballers
Serbian expatriate sportspeople in Slovenia
Expatriate footballers in Slovenia
Serbian expatriate sportspeople in Albania
Expatriate footballers in Albania
Kategoria Superiore players
KF Apolonia Fier players